Jamshid "Jimmy" Delshad is an Iranian-American politician in the state of California. He became Mayor of Beverly Hills on March 21, 2007 when he was sworn in by Fred Hayman, and again on March 16, 2010.  He is the first Iranian-American to hold public office in Beverly Hills.

Biography
Delshad was born to a Jewish family in Neyriz. He left Iran in 1959 and came to the United States with his brothers. He studied at the University of Minnesota and received his bachelor's degree from California State University, Northridge.  He started a technology company in 1978.

Political career
In 1998 he became the first Persian Jew to be elected as president of Sinai Temple, Los Angeles' oldest and largest Conservative congregation.

In 2003 he was elected to the Beverly Hills city council, and became mayor in 2007. On March 16, 2010, Delshad began his second one-year term as mayor of Beverly Hills.

References

External links 
 Official Campaign Website
 Iranian Jew poised to become mayor of Beverly Hills

American people of Iranian-Jewish descent
Iranian emigrants to the United States
California State University, Northridge alumni
Living people
University of Minnesota alumni
People from Shiraz
Iranian Jews
American Mizrahi Jews
Jewish American people in California politics
Mayors of Beverly Hills, California
Jewish mayors of places in the United States
1940 births
American politicians of Iranian descent
21st-century American Jews